The 5.6.7.8's are a Japanese rock band from Tokyo. They first started performing as a quartet in Tokyo, and recruited guest performers during their Australian tour. They became a trio in 1992, before touring Australia.

Members
The 5.6.7.8's formed when Sachiko and Yoshiko "Ronnie" Fujiyama, two sisters from Tokyo who both shared a passion for rock and roll, founded the band in 1986 with two other members. Originally, the line-up consisted of Yoshiko on vocals and guitar, Rico on second guitar, Yoshie on bass guitar and Sachiko on drums. After several line-up changes (including the bassist Yoshiko "Yama" Yamaguchi, who was the bassist featured in the Kill Bill movie), the band eventually became a trio after Rico's and Yoshie's departures. Yoshiko and Sachiko are still the main components in the band, and now Akiko Omo has rejoined the band as the bass guitarist (She originally joined the 5.6.7.8's in the early 1990s).

Even though the group mostly sing their songs in Japanese, they do many covers of American rock and roll records from the 1950s to the 1980s. However, their official website and most of their fansites and fanclubs are in Japanese, as they have their biggest following in their home country.

Yoshiko, who plays a Teisco guitar and sports a "Teenage Queen Delinquent" tattoo on her upper right arm, was initially the lead vocalist, but as the band performed more rock and roll songs originally performed by female groups, every member had equal parts in vocals and many songs are performed singing simultaneously.

The 5.6.7.8's in the West

The 5.6.7.8's became known in the West after their appearance in Kill Bill Vol. 1, in which they performed "I Walk Like Jayne Mansfield", "I'm Blue" (a cover of The Ikettes' song) and "Woo Hoo" in a Tokyo club, "The House Of Blue Leaves". On the Special Bonus Features of the Kill Bill Volume 1 DVD, one of the specials featured a live performance which shows the 5.6.7.8's singing "I Walk Like Jayne Mansfield" and "I'm Blue" during filming of the movie. The 5.6.7.8's song "The Barracuda" is featured in The Fast and the Furious: Tokyo Drift soundtrack.

According to Kill Bill director Quentin Tarantino, he discovered the music of the 5.6.7.8's after hearing it in an urban clothing store in Tokyo, hours before going to the airport. Tarantino asked if he could purchase the CD from the store, as he had no time to go to a music shop. When the shop assistant on duty refused, the manager was called. When Tarantino offered the manager double the retail price of the CD, he acquired it.

They also became renowned for the use of their cover of The Rock-A-Teens song, "Woo Hoo", in advertisements for Carling lager and Vonage VoIP service in the mid-2000s. The song reached No. 28 on the UK Singles Chart in 2004. The follow-up song was "I'm Blue"; it peaked at No. 71 on the same chart two months later.

The 5.6.7.8's have also toured many countries including China, Australia, the United States, and their native Japan.

Style and influences 
The 5.6.7.8's music draws from multiple genres of American music, including rock and roll, surf, rockabilly, doo-wop, punk rock and psychobilly. According to Yoshiko "Ronnie" Fujiyama, the band wanted to "deconstruct rock 'n' roll into punk music by using distortion and noise and screaming." The band's influences include Chuck Berry and Sex Pistols. The 5.6.7.8's sound has been classified as garage rock, rock and roll, garage punk, punk rock, rockabilly, roots rock, surf punk and surf rock.

Discography
 Albums
 Golden Hits of the 5.6.7.8's (Tokyo Stiff, 1988) (Hana, 2003)
 The 5.6.7.8's (Timebomb, 1994)
 Teenage Mojo Workout (Timebomb, 2002)
 Tanukigoten (Timebomb, 2014)

EPs
 Mondo Girls A-Go-Go (1989)
 I Was a Teenage Cave Woman !!! (Tokyo Karate, 1991)
 Bomb the Twist (Sympathy for the Record Industry, 1996)
 Pin Heel Stomp (Timebomb, 1998)
  Pretty Little Lily Can Dance No More 7" inch/CD EP (Deckrec, 2002)

Singles
 "Ah-So"/"She Was A Mau-Mau" (Giant Claw, 1992)
 "I Need A Man"/"Long Tall Sally" (Planet Pimp, 1993)
 "I Walk Like Jane Mansfield"/"Cat Fight Run" (Estrus, 1993)
 "Edi Is A Sweet Candy"/"Teenage Head"/"Scream" (Rockville, 1993)
 "The Spell Stroll"/"Roadrunner" (Weed, 1995)
 "Bomb The Twist"/"It's Rainy" (Sympathy For The Record Industry, 1996)
 "Continental Hop"/"Jump Jack, Jump" (Time Bomb, 1997)
 "The Barraacyda"/"Tallahassee Lassie" (Time Bomb, 1997)
 "Silly Willy"/"Mr. Lee" (Dionysus, 1998)
 "Come See Me"/"Mashed Potato"/"Gerupin Rock" (Thunderbaby, 1994)
 "I'm Blue"/"(I'm Sorry Mamma) I'm A Wild One" (Sweet Nothings, 2002)
 "Rock And Roll Santa"/"Harlem Shuffle" (Norton, 2003
 "Woo Hoo"/"Guitar Date" (Sweet Nothings, 2004)
 Split 7" single with The Church Keys - "19th Nervous Breakdown" (Norton, 2004)
 Sho-Jo-Ji (The Hungry Racoon)"/"Charuema Sobaya (The Soba Song)" (Third Man, 2011)
 Great Balls Of Fire"/"Hanky Panky" (Third Man, 2011)
 "Mothra" b/w "Dream Boy" (Time Bomb, 2014)
 "I Walk Like Jane Mansfield"/"Battle Without Honor Or Humanity (Kill Bill Theme)" (Time Bomb, 2017)
 "The Barracuda"/"Movin'" (Time Bomb, 2017)
 Steel Rats (Vinyl Special Edition) Split 7" single with Arkadiusz Reikowski - "The Hoovering" (Tate Multimedia, 2018)
 "Woo-Hoo"/"Dream Boy" (Time Bomb, 2018)
 Split 7"single with Bloodshot Bill - "My Little Muck Muck" (Time Bomb, 2019)
 "Nutrocker"/"Chopped Onion Boogie" (The 5, 6, 7, 8's; 2019)
 "My Little Muck Muck" (Pig Baby)

Live
 Live at Third Man Records (Third Man, 2011)

Compilations
 The 5.6.7.8's Can't Help It! (Au Go Go, Rockville, 1991)
 Bomb The Rocks: Early Days Singles 1989-1996 (Timebomb, 2003)
 Best Hits of the 5.6.7.8's (Timebomb, 2019)

Videos
 Squid Heaven Complete Edition Video 6 VHS (Ika-Ten, 1989) - "Motor Cycle Go-G0-Go"
 Where The Action Is!: Soft, Hell! VHS (Jungle Life/LAFF International/Soft, Hell!, 1996) - "Three Cool Cats"
 The Wild Weekend Video VHS/PAL (Exotic Entertainment, 1998) 
 Bottle Up & Go!: Soft, Hell! Video Compilation #2 VHS (Jungle Life/LLAFF International/Soft, Hell!, 1998) - "Bomb The Twist"
 Kill Bill Volume 1 (Blu-ray) (Miramax/Roadshow Entertainment, 2003) - "I Walk Like Jane Mansfield", "I'm Blue" Both played live as a special feature 
 Soft, Hell! Video Compilation Special Edition Ltd. 2XVHS (Soft, Hell!) - "Three Cool Cats", "Bomb The Twist" 
 Live At The Garage Rockin' Craze split DVD=V with Saturns, The Rizlaz (Radio Underground, 2005) 
 Once Upon A Time 1992-2008 DVD (Time Bomb, 2013)

References

External links
 Official website
 Nippop Profile | The 5.6.7.8's
 The Japan Times Online: Article Interview With The 5.6.7.8's
 The 5.6.7.8's file at JaME
 

Japanese garage rock groups
Japanese musical trios
Japanese punk rock groups
Rockabilly music groups
Surf music groups
Musical groups established in 1986
1986 establishments in Japan
Musical groups from Tokyo
Third Man Records artists
Norton Records artists
Sympathy for the Record Industry artists
Au Go Go Records artists
All-female punk bands